Corte Brugnatella is a comune (municipality) in the Province of Piacenza in the Italian region Emilia-Romagna, located about  west of Bologna and about  southwest of Piacenza.

References

External links
 Corte Brugnatella on The Companile Project

Cities and towns in Emilia-Romagna